WRKB (1460 AM) is a radio station broadcasting a Southern Gospel format. Licensed to Kannapolis, North Carolina, United States, it serves the Rowan and Cabarrus county areas. The station is owned by Ford Broadcasting.

History
Carl L Ford's first job was at WRKB in Kannapolis, which was owned by Bill Hefner at the time. Now Ford and his wife Angela own Ford Broadcasting, which owns WRKB and WRNA. The two stations broadcast the same programming, and Ford hosts a morning show on both stations.

References

External links

Southern Gospel radio stations in the United States
RKB